The titles Baron Beauchamp and Viscount Beauchamp have been created several times throughout English and British history. There is an extant Viscountcy of Beauchamp, held by the Seymour family, Marquesses of Hertford.

Beauchamp family
The name Beauchamp (French "beautiful/fair field"), Latinised to de Bello Campo ("from the beautiful field/fair field"), is borne by three of the most ancient Anglo-Norman families which settled in England during the Norman Conquest of 1066: Beauchamp of Worcestershire, of Somerset and of Bedfordshire. The surname was taken from their respective manors in Normandy and there is no evidence of any shared origin between the families of that name seated in those three separate counties. The Bedfordshire branch died out in the male line after only two generations. The heir of the Somerset branch was the powerful Seymour family, whilst the Worcestershire branch achieved the greatest power and prominence as Earls of Warwick.

Barons Beauchamp, first creation ("de Somerset") (1299–1361)

(Descendants of the feudal barons of Hatch Beauchamp in Somerset)
John de Beauchamp, 1st Baron Beauchamp (1274–1336)
John de Beauchamp, 2nd Baron Beauchamp (d. 1343)
John de Beauchamp, 3rd Baron Beauchamp (1330–1361) (abeyant on his death)

The barony was unsuccessfully claimed in 1924 by Ulric Oliver Thynne.

Baron Beauchamp, second creation ("de Warwick") (1350–1360)

John de Beauchamp, 1st Baron Beauchamp de Warwick (1316–1360)

Baron Beauchamp, third creation ("of Bletso") (1363–1380)

Roger Beauchamp, 1st Baron Beauchamp of Bletso (died 1380)
Sir Roger Beauchamp (died c. 1374)
Sir Roger Beauchamp, de jure 2nd Baron Beauchamp of Bletso (d. 3 May 1406) 
Sir John Beauchamp, de jure 3rd Baron Beauchamp of Bletso (d. 1412–1414)

Barons Beauchamp, fourth creation ("of Kidderminster") (1387–1400)

This was the first barony created by letters patent, by King Richard II in 1387. They were seated at Holt Castle, Worcestershire, a junior branch of the senior Elmley line.
John de Beauchamp, 1st Baron Beauchamp (1319–1388) (forfeit 1388)
John de Beauchamp, 2nd Baron Beauchamp (1378–1420) (attainder reversed 1398; forfeit in 1400 by renewal of attainder)

Barons Beauchamp, fifth creation ("of Powick") (1447–1503)
Descended from Walter de Beauchamp (died 1303/6) of Beauchamp's Court, Alcester in Warwickshire and of Beauchamp Court, Powick in Worcestershire, Steward of the Household to King Edward I and  younger brother of William de Beauchamp, 9th Earl of Warwick (c.1238-1298), the first of his family to hold that title (inherited from their mother).
John Beauchamp, 1st Baron Beauchamp (d. 1475) (great-great grandson of Walter de Beauchamp (died 1303/6))
Richard Beauchamp, 2nd Baron Beauchamp (1435–1503)

Seymour family

Viscount Beauchamp, first creation ("of Hache") (1536–1552)
The Seymour family inherited the capital manor of Hatch Beauchamp (anciently Hache) due to the marriage of Roger Seymour (d.c.1361) to Cecily Beauchamp (d.1393), the aunt and heiress of John IV de Beauchamp, 3rd Baron Beauchamp (1330-1361), feudal baron of Hatch Beauchamp.
Edward Seymour, 1st Viscount Beauchamp (created Earl of Hertford in 1537 and Duke of Somerset in 1547; forfeit in 1552)

Barons Beauchamp, sixth creation ("of Hache") (1559–1750)
Edward Seymour, 1st Earl of Hertford, 1st Baron Beauchamp (1537–1621)
William Seymour, 2nd Duke of Somerset, 2nd Baron Beauchamp (1587–1660)
William Seymour, 3rd Duke of Somerset, 3rd Baron Beauchamp (1654–1671)
John Seymour, 4th Duke of Somerset, 4th Baron Beauchamp (d. 1675)
Francis Seymour, 5th Duke of Somerset, 5th Baron Beauchamp (1658–1678)
Charles Seymour, 6th Duke of Somerset, 6th Barom Beauchamp (1662–1748)
Algernon Seymour, 7th Duke of Somerset, 7th Baron Beauchamp (1684–1750) (Barony extinct on his death)

Viscounts Beauchamp, second creation ("of Hache") (1750—)
Francis Seymour-Conway, 1st Earl of Hertford, 1st Viscount Beauchamp (1718–1794) (created Marquess of Hertford in 1793)
See Marquess of Hertford for further Viscounts Beauchamp.

Lygon family

Barons Beauchamp, seventh creation ("of Powyke") (1806–1979)
William Lygon, 1st Baron Beauchamp (1747–1816) (created Earl Beauchamp in 1815)
See Earl Beauchamp for descents.

See also
 Beauchamp baronets

References

1299 establishments in England
Extinct baronies in the Peerage of England
Beauchamp family
Abeyant baronies in the Peerage of England
Forfeited baronies in the Peerage of England
Extinct baronies in the Peerage of the United Kingdom
Noble titles created in 1387
Noble titles created in 1447
Noble titles created in 1559
Noble titles created in 1806
Noble titles created for UK MPs